Amphiura callida is a species of brittle star belonging to the family Amphiuridae. It is only known from the continental shelf off the coast of Cabo Frio, southeastern Brazil (depth 50 m).

This is a rather robust brittle star with a disc diameter of up to 10 mm and an arm length of up to 45 mm. It can be distinguished from its congeners from the leaf-like shape of the distal oral papillae and the presence of groups of two to seven spines along the entire length of the arm.

References

Animals described in 2001
Amphiuridae